Alice Freeman (born 6 September 1978 in Oxford) is a British rower. 

Freeman studied at Durham University and St Edmund Hall, Oxford. She finished 5th in the women's eight at the 2008 Summer Olympics.

References

External links 
 
 Alice Freeman at British Rowing (archived)
 
 

1978 births
Living people
English female rowers
British female rowers
Sportspeople from Oxford
Rowers at the 2008 Summer Olympics
Olympic rowers of Great Britain
Alumni of St Edmund Hall, Oxford
Alumni of Hatfield College, Durham
World Rowing Championships medalists for Great Britain
Durham University Boat Club rowers
European Rowing Championships medalists